The following list is a discography of recordings by MNEK, a British record producer and recording artist from East London, United Kingdom.

Studio albums

Extended plays

Singles

As lead artist

As featured artist

Guest appearances

Notes

References

Discography
Pop music discographies
Discographies of British artists